Radio Vip was a radio station which broadcast to Western Europe by Satellite and Worldwide via the internet.

Format
Its music format was 'Soulful Optimism' featuring Motown, Soul music, Disco, Philadelphia soul and related genres from 1964 onwards.

History
VIP commenced broadcasting on 14 February 2006. 
Its roster of highly experienced announcers included Dick Heatherton, John Hook, Bobby Jay, Kev Roberts, Bob Shannon and Andy Wint.

VIP opened in early 2011.

Defunct radio stations in the United Kingdom
Radio stations established in 2006